The 2018 Men's Under 21 Australian Hockey Championships is a Field Hockey tournament being held in the New South Wales city of Sydney between 4–11 July 2018.

Competition format
The tournament is divided into two pools, Pool A and Pool B, consisting of four teams in a round robin format. At the conclusion of the pool stage, teams progress to the quarterfinals, where the winners progress to contest the medals, while the losing teams playoff for fifth to eighth place.

Teams

  ACT
  SA

  NSW
  TAS 

  NSW B
  VIC 

  QLD
  WA

Results

Preliminary round

Pool A

Pool B

Classification round

Quarterfinals

Fifth to eighth place classification

Crossover

Seventh and eighth place

Fifth and sixth place

First to fourth place classification

Semi-finals

Third and fourth place

Final

Statistics

Final standings

Goalscorers

References

2018
2018 in Australian field hockey
Sports competitions in Sydney